Jesús Sergio Alcántara Núñez (born 21 June 1965) is a Mexican politician affiliated with the Institutional Revolutionary Party. As of 2014 he served as Deputy of the LX Legislature of the Mexican Congress representing the State of Mexico.

References

1965 births
Living people
Politicians from the State of Mexico
Institutional Revolutionary Party politicians
21st-century Mexican politicians
Autonomous University of Mexico State alumni
Panamerican University alumni
Members of the Congress of the State of Mexico
Municipal presidents in the State of Mexico
Deputies of the LX Legislature of Mexico
Members of the Chamber of Deputies (Mexico) for the State of Mexico